"Mutilated Lips" is a song by American rock band Ween. It was released as the lead single from their sixth studio album, The Mollusk (1997), on June 24, 1997.

Composition
The song lyrics refer to being under the influence of psychedelic drugs. It explains that
while under the influence of psychedelics, the distorted perception of sight while looking at
an unattractive girl appearing to have mutilated lips. The song's inclusion of acoustic guitar, bongos, synths, and keyboards were said to give the song a "psych-folk trippiness." The lyrics also make reference to the Ethiopian emperor Haile Selassie I.

In other media 
The lyrics "Mutilated lips give a kiss on the wrist of the worm like tips of tentacles expanding" was directly referenced in
the novel The Procession of Mollusks (2009) by Eric E. Olson. The girl from "Mutilated Lips" was also a character in the novel.

Track list
"Mutilated Lips – 3:49
"Ocean Man" – 2:07

References

Songs about drugs
1997 singles
Ween songs
1997 songs
Elektra Records singles
Songs written by Gene Ween
Songs written by Dean Ween
Songs about Haile Selassie